The Las Vegas Grand Prix is a planned Formula One Grand Prix due to form part of the 2023 Formula One World Championship, with the event taking place in Las Vegas, Nevada, on a temporary street circuit including the Las Vegas Strip.

History 
This event will mark the first time Formula One races in Las Vegas since the 1982 Caesars Palace Grand Prix. The event is due to take place around the Las Vegas Strip. It will be the third Grand Prix in the United States to take place on the  calendar after the Miami and the United States Grands Prix, and will mark the first time since  that there will be three races held in the United States in a Formula One season.

Circuit 
The  street circuit features 17 corners and a  straight. The circuit runs counter clockwise, and starts in a disused parking lot which will be re-developed for the pits and paddock area, and contains permanent track. The first corner is a hairpin, and after that the course bends slightly left and then into a fast right, transitioning from the permanent circuit to city streets. The cars go  down Koval Lane, before entering a slow 90 degree right, and then entering a long, sweeping left which encircles the new MSG Sphere arena, before going through a left-right twisty section, that is a change from the original design, and then a slightly faster left that transitions onto Sands Avenue. The track then goes through two very fast bends on Sands Avenue before entering a slow left onto Las Vegas Boulevard, otherwise known as the Las Vegas Strip. This is a  flat-out section with two straights and a slight sweeping left that goes past some of Las Vegas' most famous hotels and casinos. The circuit then goes through a tight series of slow corners onto Harmon Avenue, down an  straight before going through a very fast left to complete the lap and transition back to the permanent track past the pits.

References

External links

Official website

 
Formula One Grands Prix
Recurring sporting events established in 2023
2023 establishments in the United States